Suntex is the name of an unincorporated community in Harney County, in the U.S. state of Oregon. It was established with the placement of a post office in the valley of Silver Creek west of Burns and north of U.S. Route 20.

The Suntex post office was set up in 1916 and closed in 1949, after which Suntex mail was handled through the post office in Riley. W. F. Sturges, the first postmaster at Suntex, said that postal authorities had assigned the name "Suntex", which had no local significance, for reasons he was unaware of.

There is still a small cluster of buildings at Suntex.

Education
The zoned K-8 school is Suntex Elementary School. The previous campus was destroyed in a 1978 fire.

High school students are zoned to Crane Union High School, of Harney County Union High School District 1J.

Harney County is not in a community college district but has a "contract out of district" (COD) with Treasure Valley Community College. TVCC operates the Burns Outreach Center in Burns.

References

Unincorporated communities in Harney County, Oregon
Unincorporated communities in Oregon